Ephelis is a genus of moths of the family Crambidae.

Species
Ephelis belutschistanalis (Amsel, 1961)
Ephelis brabanti (Chrétien, 1908)
Ephelis chirazalis (Amsel, 1949)
Ephelis cruentalis (Geyer in Hübner, 1832)
Ephelis flavomarginalis (Amsel, 1951)
Ephelis maesi (Mey, 2011)
Ephelis palealis (Amsel, 1949)
Ephelis pudicalis (Duponchel, 1832)
Ephelis robustalis Amsel, 1970
Ephelis sudanalis (Zerny in Rebel & Zerny, 1917)

References

Odontiini
Crambidae genera
Taxa named by Julius Lederer